Galeria Kaufhof GmbH was a German department store chain, headquartered in Cologne. It was a member of the International Association of Department Stores from 1930 to 2010, with various CEOs acting as presidents of the Association over time.

Until 30 September 2015, the company was a subsidiary of Metro AG, when the company announced that it had been acquired by Hudson's Bay Company. In September 2018 they announced plans to merge with their largest competitor Karstadt. In June 2019 all the shares of Galeria Kaufhof were bought by the Austrian company Signa Holding, who been the partner in the former merger.

On March 25, 2019 Karstadt & Galeria Kaufhof launched their merged company, Galeria Karstadt Kaufhof, based in Essen, with a new logo and a new website galeria.de.

Business portfolio
Galeria Kaufhof - 97 branches 
DINEA Gastronomie GmbH - 58 restaurants
Galeria Inno - 16 stores in Belgium

References

External links

 

Retail companies established in 1879
Companies based in Cologne
Retail companies of Germany
Department stores of Germany
1879 establishments in Germany